Martín de Mayorga Ferrer (September 12, 1721 in Barcelona, Spain – 1783 in Spain) was a Spanish military officer, governor of the Captaincy General of Guatemala (from June 1773 to 1779), and interim viceroy of New Spain (from August 23, 1779 to April 28, 1783).

Career 
Martín de Mayorga Ferrer was a field marshal in the royal army of Spain, and a knight of the military Order of Alcántara. He was governor, president of the Audiencia and captain general of Guatemala at the time of the devastating 1773 Guatemala earthquake on July 29, 1773.

He was still serving in those positions at the time of the death of New Spain Viceroy Antonio María de Bucareli y Ursúa in Mexico City. When the Audiencia of Mexico opened the sealed instructions in the event of the death of Bucareli, they found that the captain general of Guatemala was named as replacement. When the instructions had been written, this was expected to be Matías de Gálvez y Gallardo, brother of José de Gálvez, minister of the Indies. However, Gálvez, although appointed to the position, had not yet arrived to fill it. The Audiencia of Mexico, therefore, named Marshal Martín de Mayorga, who still held the position, viceroy of New Spain.

Mayorga arrived in Mexico City August 23, 1779, and took up his new position. Of immediate concern were preparations for defense in the war that France and Spain had recently declared on England. He greatly reinforced Havana, took extra precautions at Veracruz, and sent an expedition under Bernardo de Gálvez to Florida to aid the English colonists in their revolution against England. There was also fighting with the English in Belize.

In 1779 there was an epidemic of smallpox that spread to many cities of the colony and caused many deaths. Viceroy Mayorga spent considerable sums to aid the sick and dying. He offered his resignation (the first of several times), but it was not accepted.

In January 1780, the indigenous community of Izúcar, (Puebla), rose in rebellion because of mistreatment. Captains José Antonio de Urízar and Tomás Pontón were sent to suppress the rebellion. A large number of captured rebels were sent to Havana to serve as sailors in the fleet.

Mayorga did much to improve the capital, paving many streets with stones and cleaning the waterways and aqueducts in an effort to prevent another epidemic.

In 1780 he directed the governor of Puebla to assemble documents related to the history of New Spain, beginning with the Historia Antigua de la Nueva España of Father Mariano Veytia and papers collected by Lorenzo Boturini Bernaducci. This project probably saved numerous documents that would otherwise have been lost.

In 1783, the viceroy once again submitted his resignation. This time it was accepted. He turned over the government of the colony to his replacement, Matías de Gálvez, on April 28, 1783, and left for Spain. He died just before or just after reaching port at Cádiz. Some said he was poisoned by his successor. (The two were enemies and Gálvez had never forgiven him for occupying the viceroyalty in his stead.) However, this was never substantiated.

Descendants
Armando Mayorga

References
 García Puron, Manuel, México y sus gobernantes, v. 1. Mexico City: Joaquín Porrua, 1984.
 Orozco L., Fernando, Fechas Históricas de México. Mexico City: Panorama Editorial, 1988, .
 Orozco Linares, Fernando, Gobernantes de México. Mexico City: Panorama Editorial, 1985, .

1720s births
1783 deaths
People from Barcelona
Viceroys of New Spain
Governors of Guatemala
Spanish generals
Knights of the Order of Alcántara